KCSD may refer to:

 KCSD (FM), a radio station (90.9 FM) licensed to Sioux Falls, South Dakota, United States
 KCSD-TV, a television station (channel 24) licensed to Sioux Falls, South Dakota, United States
 Kake City School District
 Keokuk Community School District